The 1974 BYU Cougars football team represented Brigham Young University during the 1974 NCAA Division I football season. The Cougars were led by third-year head coach LaVell Edwards and played their home games at Cougar Stadium in Provo, Utah. The team competed as a member of the Western Athletic Conference, winning the conference for the first time since 1965 with an undefeated conference record of 6–0–1. BYU was invited to the 1974 Fiesta Bowl, where they lost to Oklahoma State.

Schedule

Roster

Game summaries

Colorado State
The game ended in controversy as Colorado State scored on the game's final play but the ensuing extra point from the 35-yard line, due to an unsportsmanlike conduct penalty, was missed although one official ruled that the attempt was good.

References

BYU
BYU Cougars football seasons
Western Athletic Conference football champion seasons
BYU Cougars football